John Henry Moses KCVO (born 12 January 1938) was the Dean of St Paul's from November 1996 until his retirement on 31 August 2006.

Moses' last service as dean was a Sung Eucharist on 12 July 2006. It was attended by over 2,000 friends, family, colleagues and invited guests including the Duchess of Gloucester, Baroness Thatcher and the Lord Mayor of London.

Education
Moses was educated at Ealing County Grammar School for Boys, a state grammar school (now Ealing, Hammersmith and West London College) in West London, followed by the University of Nottingham and Trinity Hall at the University of Cambridge. He then studied at Lincoln Theological College, where he was ordained in 1964.

Life and career
Moses became an assistant curate of St Andrew's Bedford, then the rector of the Coventry East Team Ministry and the rural dean of Coventry East. In 1977 he was appointed the Archdeacon of Southend, also serving as the Bishop of Chelmsford's officer for industry and commerce, chairman of the diocesan retreat house and chairman of the diocesan advisory committee. In 1982 he became the Provost of Chelmsford before becoming Dean of St Paul's in 1996. He has published a number of books, including The Sacrifice of God (1992) and A Broad and Living Way (1995). In 1992, he was appointed the first rector of Anglia Ruskin University. In 1997 he was made an Honorary Doctor of the University.

In 2006, he was created a Knight Commander of the Royal Victorian Order (KCVO) and thus entitled to be called "Sir"; however, as he is a British cleric, Moses only uses the post-nominals of "KCVO". Other honorable titles held by Moses include Brother of the Order of St. John and Officer of the Order of Istiqlal of the Hashemite Kingdom of Jordan.

In 2013, Moses was appointed the John Macquarrie Professor of Anglican Theology at the Graduate Theological Foundation in Mishawaka, Indiana.

Styles
 Mr John Moses (1938–1964)
 The Revd John Moses (1964–1977)
 The Ven John Moses (1977–1982)
 The Very Revd John Moses (1982–1997)
 The Very Revd Dr John Moses (1997–2006)
 The Very Revd Dr John Moses KCVO (2006–present)

Writings
 The Sacrifice of God: A Holistic Theory of Atonement, Norwich: Canterbury Press, 1994
 A Broad and Living Way: Church and State -- A Continuing Establishment, Norwich: Canterbury Press, 1995
 The Desert: An Anthology for Lent, Morehouse Publishing, 1997
 One Equall Light: An Anthology of the Writings of John Donne (ed) Norwich: Canterbury Press, 2003
 The Language of Love: Exploring Prayer: An Anthology, Canterbury Press, 2013

References

External links
  BBC article: "Top dean attacks gay 'witch-hunt'"

Deans of St Paul's
1938 births
Living people
Alumni of Trinity Hall, Cambridge
Archdeacons of Southend
People educated at Ealing County Grammar School for Boys
Provosts and Deans of Chelmsford
Alumni of Lincoln Theological College
20th-century English Anglican priests
21st-century English Anglican priests
Graduate Theological Foundation faculty